Adam Fforde is an economist specializing in Vietnam.

Education

Born in London in 1953, he was educated at Westminster School and the University of Oxford. Changing his academic focus from Engineering to Economics, Fforde attained his Ph.D (with a thesis on 'Problems of Agricultural Development in North Vietnam') from Cambridge University in 1982.

Career

He spent the 1980s and 1990s in Hanoi and Canberra advising on development practice for national aid agencies and NGOs operating in South-East Asia.

Accepting a Fellowship in 1999 at the National University of Singapore, Fforde subsequently held a number of academic posts in Melbourne, Australia. He is currently among the most widely cited academics writing on contemporary Vietnam, as well as the author of textbooks and critical works on the theory and methodology of development practice.

He is a Professorial Fellow at Victoria University's Centre for Strategic Economic Studies.

Personal life

Fforde is the eldest son of John Fforde (1921-2000), a senior figure in the Bank of England, and the brother of British novelist Jasper Fforde (born 1961).  He is married with four children and currently lives in Melbourne, Australia.

Bibliography

 Reinventing ‘development’ – the sceptical change agent, New York: Palgrave-MacMillan 2017. 
 Understanding development economics: its challenge to development studies, 2013, London: Routledge
 Coping with facts – a skeptic’s guide to the problem of development, 2009, Bloomfield, CT: Kumarian Press.  
 Vietnamese State Industry and the Political Economy of Commercial Renaissance: Dragon's tooth or curate's egg? 2007 Oxford: Chandos
 The Agrarian Question in North Vietnam 1974-79: a study of cooperator resistance to State policy, 1989, New York: M.E.Sharpe 
 From Plan to Market: The Economic Transition in Vietnam, Boulder CO: Westview, 1996. ASIN: 0813326834. (co-authored with Stefan de Vylder)
 Vietnam - an economy in transition, 1988, Stockholm: SIDA (ISBN n/a). (co-authored with Stefan de Vylder) 
 The Limits of National Liberation - problems of economic management in the Democratic Republic of Vietnam, with a Statistical Appendix, 1987, London: Croom-Helm. . (co-authored with Suzanne H. Paine)

References 

Living people
1953 births
Date of birth missing (living people)
People educated at Westminster School, London
Alumni of the University of Oxford
Alumni of the University of Cambridge
Academic staff of the Victoria University, Melbourne
English expatriates in Australia
20th-century  British economists
21st-century  British economists
English economics writers